#1's is Mariah Carey's sixth VHS/DVD release. A collection of the music videos of her U.S. number-one singles (songs that reached number one on the Billboard Hot 100) up to that time, the home video was originally released on VHS in December 7, 1999, while the DVD was released on February 1, 2000. A year before this, Carey had released a greatest hits compilation, #1's, which included her thirteen U.S. number-one singles up to that point. The DVD of the same name is based on that album, but by the time of its release, Carey had already scored a fourteenth U.S. number one, "Heartbreaker", from her latest studio release Rainbow. Its music video and the video of its remix (as a bonus track) were thus included on the DVD. During the month of the DVD's release, Carey had also earned her fifteenth number one single, "Thank God I Found You".

The DVD does not include the official music videos for "Vision of Love", "Love Takes Time", and "Someday," as she admitted that she did not like some of her early music videos. They are replaced by live performances culled from previous DVD/video releases. The video for "I Don't Wanna Cry" presented on this release is a director's cut, which removes sepia sequences that were originally aired and that Carey also disliked.

#1's was re-released in 2008 as part of Mariah Carey: DVD Collection, a 2 DVD set including also Fantasy: Mariah Carey at Madison Square Garden. The video features a shortened version from the original, without the introductory sections per track.

Track listing

Charts

Certifications

References

Mariah Carey video albums